The National Archives Site is an archeological site at the National Archives facility in College Park, Prince George's County, Maryland. The site contains archeological remains from prehistoric settlements during the Late Archaic period, c. 4000-1500 B.C. Stone artifacts recovered through archeological testing indicate that this camp served as a place of stone tool manufacture and probably as a staging point for hunting and foraging. Physical integrity of the prehistoric component is high, with little plow disturbance or admixture with artifacts from other periods. The presence of a small number of other artifacts, including the projectile points, a spokeshave, and utilized flakes, indicates that the site also served in other hunting and foraging pursuits. It is one of a relatively small percentage of known prehistoric properties in Maryland with undisturbed archeological deposits. 

It was listed on the National Register of Historic Places on August 22, 1996.

References

External links
The National Archives Site, Inventory No.: PG:66-36, including a photograph dated August 1994, Maryland Historical Trust, Maryland Department of Planning
Archeological Sites; 66-036 National Archives Archeological Site (18PR355) (NR), Illustrated Inventory of Historic Sites and Districts, Prince George's County, Maryland, The Maryland-National Capital Park and Planning Commission, April 2011, p. 256

Archaeological sites in Prince George's County, Maryland
Archaeological sites on the National Register of Historic Places in Maryland
Native American history of Maryland
National Register of Historic Places in Prince George's County, Maryland
College Park, Maryland